A wrong is an act that is illegal or immoral.

Wrong may also refer to:

 Civil wrong, a legal term
 Wrong (film), a 2012 comedy directed by Quentin Dupieux
 Wrong (album), by Nomeansno, 1989

Songs 
 "Wrong" (Depeche Mode song), 2009
 "Wrong" (Everything but the Girl song), 1996
 "Wrong" (Kimberley Locke song), 2004
 "Wrong" (Waylon Jennings song), 1990
 "Wrong" (Zayn song), 2016
 "Wrong", by Eden from Vertigo, 2018
 "Wrong", by The Kid Laroi from F*ck Love, 2020
 "Wrong", by Louise from Heavy Love, 2020
 "Wrong", by Luh Kel, 2019

People with the surname 
 Dennis Wrong (1923–2018), American sociologist
 George MacKinnon Wrong (1860–1948), Canadian clergyman and historian
 Humphrey Hume Wrong (1894–1954), Canadian ambassador to the United States
 Michela Wrong (born 1961), British journalist and author
 Oliver Wrong (1925–2012), British doctor and kidney researcher

See also
 
 
 Error
 False (disambiguation)